John Stanley Carroll (December 18, 1929 – September 19, 2021) was an American lawyer and politician who served as a state representative and state senator from Hawaii as a Republican. He was also a perennial candidate for multiple statewide offices in Hawaii.

Early life
John Stanley Carroll was born in St. Marys, Kansas on December 18, 1929 to Laura Fay and Hugh "Stanley" Carroll, a chemistry professor who later worked on the Manhattan Project. He initially began his education at Saint Mary's University, but in 1949 he moved to the Territory of Hawaii on a scholarship to play football for the University of Hawaii at Hilo. He later transferred to the University of Hawaii at Manoa and graduated with a Bachelor’s Degree in Education.

During the Korean War he served in the United States Army and later transferred to the United States Air Force. He graduated from the Air Command and Staff College and the Air War College, became a staff judge advocate for the Army National Guard and the Air National Guard, and retired from the Air Force as a colonel. After military service, he worked as a pilot for Hawaiian Airlines.

Career

In 1966, Carroll ran for one of Hawaii's two at-large congressional district seats; he came in third behind incumbents Patsy Mink and Spark Matsunaga. He briefly ran for the House again in 1968, but dropped out of that race and ran instead for one of the Honolulu City Council's six at-large seats; he came in eighth of twelve candidates.

State Legislature

House
On August 17, 1970, Carroll announced that he would seek the Republican nomination for one of three 12th state house district seats; he came in first, ahead of five other candidates. A residency challenge argued that he was currently living in the 13th District, which would have rendered him ineligible to run, but the challenge was rejected by Lieutenant Governor Thomas Gill.

On July 24, 1972, he announced that he would seek reelection; he came in second of six candidates. He was redistricted into the 11th House District, which only had two seats; on July 31, 1974, he announced that he would seek a third term, and placed first out of four candidates. On July 29, 1976, he announced that he would seek a fourth term; he placed second out of five candidates.

Carroll proposed a bill that would create the procedure for the state constitution's impeachment provisions for a governor or lieutenant governor (the state constitution specified that the state legislature could do it, but not how to do it), the ability to recall elected officials, and also proposed a constitutional amendment for an environmental bill of rights.

In 1971, the state legislature was rewriting the state's penal code and considering the possibility of repealing its sodomy laws. Carroll supported repeal; he read a letter written by students from the University of Hawaii Gay Students Union, asking the state legislature to legalize homosexual sex between consenting adults.

In 1973, he introduced a bill that would prevent the charge of marijuana possession from appearing on arrest records, and would reduce the penalty for possession to a $25 fine. Later that year, he and three other Republicans also supported a bill increasing the minimum wage from $1.80 to $2.40.

In 1975, he proposed multiple bills that would create voter initiative and referendum systems. He also proposed a bill (later defeated) that would allow for the recalling of elected officials and a Castle doctrine amendment to Hawaii's penal code.

During his tenure in the House, he served on the Judiciary and Environmental Protection committees.

Senate
In late 1977, Carroll stated at a fundraiser that he was considering running for a seat in the Hawaii Senate. On July 6, 1978, he announced that he would run for one of Hawaii's four 6th Senate District seats; he came in second out of seven candidates.

During his tenure he served on the Judiciary, Agriculture, Economic Development, Consumer Protection and Commerce, and Government, Operations and Efficiency committees.

He introduced legislation that would ban public employees from striking.  He was against Hawaii's expansion of its fishing industry; he and asked Governor George Ariyoshi to ban lobster harvesting along the Leeward Islands, and voted against a resolution supporting the District of Columbia Delegate Act.

The 6th District was redistricted from four seats down to two; in the 1980 election, both incumbents, John Carroll and Anson Chong, narrowly lost reelection.

Post-Legislature

In June 1981, he was elected chairman of the Hawaii Republican Party with 341 out of 572 votes. During his tenure as chairman, he attempted to change the party's predominantly Caucasian image and to organize the party in every precinct. He refused to resign after the party's poor performance in the 1982 elections; on November 5, 1982, two party officers resigned in protest.  Carroll eventually chose not to seek reelection in 1983.

In 1979, he had invested in a diamond mine; in 1994, he filed for bankruptcy, claiming that two business partners attempted to take over his company. In 1998, Carroll ran for Hawaii's 1st Senate District, but was defeated in the general election by Lorraine Inouye.

On May 25, 2000, he announced that he would run in the Senate election against Senator Daniel Akaka, and easily won the Republican nomination. In May, he had stated that he would need $1.5 million to launch a viable campaign against Akaka, but by late October Carroll had raised less than $2,000 - while Akaka had raised $430,000. He ran campaign ads that opened with, "Aloha, I'm John Carroll, and in no way am I a racist;" in the general election, he lost to Akaka.

On November 10, 2001, he announced that he would challenge Linda Lingle for the Republican nomination for governor in the 2002 election.  He described Lingle as "unelectable," referencing her support in 1998 from anti-Cayetano voters who would remain Democratic in the 2002 election. However, he was defeated in a landslide in the primary, receiving less than 10% of the vote; Lingle received almost 90% and went on to win the general election. Carroll ran unsuccessfully for the United States House of Representatives in 2002. On May 27, 2009, he announced that he would challenge Lieutenant Governor Duke Aiona in the Republican gubernatorial primary, but received less than 5% of the vote.

On September 21, 2011, he announced that he would run for the Republican nomination for Senate against Linda Lingle; he campaigned against the Jones Act and a Native Hawaiian federal recognition bill. In the primary, he was again defeated by Lingle (she took over 90% of the vote); Carroll later endorsed Democratic Representative Mazie Hirono in the general election. In 2016, he announced that he would run in the Senate election and easily won the Republican nomination against other perennial candidates, but was defeated in a landslide by incumbent Senator Brian Schatz.

In 2017, he faced potential disbarment over two 2015 complaints of professional misconduct and agreed to give up his law license.

Following the 2018 Hawaii false missile alert message sent by the State of Hawaii's Emergency Management Agency to hundreds of thousands of Hawaii residents via their phones on January 13, 2018, Carroll dubbed the incumbent Democratic governor David Ige "Doomsday David" and called on him to resign.

In 2018, he announced that he would seek the Republican nomination for governor. In mid-March, Carroll was leading state House Minority Leader Andria Tupola in the Honolulu Star-Advertiser's statewide poll of likely 2018 Republican voters by a margin of 12 percentage points, with 40% of potential Republican voters supporting Carroll as opposed to 28% supporting Tupola. Carroll was eventually defeated by Tupola by a 20% margin in the August 11 primary.

On June 14, 2019, Carroll announced his candidacy for the 2020 Honolulu mayoral election. He placed eighth in the primary, receiving 0.7% of the vote.

He died on September 19, 2021, in Oahu, Hawaii, at age 91.

Electoral history

References

External links 

|-

1929 births
2021 deaths
Air Command and Staff College alumni
Air War College alumni
United States Army personnel of the Korean War
Aviators from Hawaii
Aviators from Kansas
Candidates in the 2000 United States elections
Candidates in the 2002 United States elections
Candidates in the 2010 United States elections
Candidates in the 2016 United States Senate elections
Commercial aviators
Hawaii lawyers
Republican Party Hawaii state senators
Hawaiian Airlines
United States Air Force Judge Advocate General's Corps
United States Army Judge Advocate General's Corps
Republican Party members of the Hawaii House of Representatives
Military personnel from Kansas
People from Hawaii (island)
People from St. Marys, Kansas
St. Mary's University School of Law alumni
State political party chairs of Hawaii
United States Air Force colonels
United States Air Force reservists
United States Army soldiers
University of Hawaiʻi at Hilo alumni
University of Hawaiʻi at Mānoa alumni
20th-century American politicians
21st-century American politicians